Suture is a compilation album by Chemlab, released on January 23, 2001 by Invisible Records. It is an expanded reissue of Magnetic Field Remixes (itself containing the complete contents of the EP Ten Ton Pressure), with remixes from the "Electric Molecular" and "Exile on Mainline" singles and one previously unreleased track named "Static Haze".

Reception

Rick Anderson of allmusic gave Suture three out of five stars and said "highly recommended to fans of funky industrialism." A critic for Ink 19 compared the collection favorably to Nitzer Ebb and praised the album for being "a fine slice of spiteful agit-dance, very familiar in a sense." Lollipop Magazine deemed the material from 10 Ton Pressure to be the highlight of the compilation, saying "the three EP tracks are old school industrial, and worth a few spins, and for those into remixes of the band’s more popular/less interesting material, there're plenty of takes on a few of them here."

Track listing

Personnel
Adapted from the Suture liner notes.

Chemlab
 Jared Louche – lead vocals, production, arrangements, design, remix (1, 2, 4, 12-14)
 Dylan Thomas More – programming, arrangements, remix (1, 2, 4, 12-14)

Additional performers
 Black Metal Box – remix (11)
 John DeSalvo – drums
 Sascha Konietzko – remix (9, 10)
 Geno Lenardo – EBow and guitar (1-4)
 Krayge Tyler – guitar (1, 4)

Production and design
 Hilary Bercovici – production (5-8)
 Jeff "Critter" Newell – production and remix (1, 2, 4, 12-14)
 Maja Prausnitz – design
 Claudine Schafer-Legrand – photography

Release history

References

External links 
 Suture at Discogs (list of releases)

Chemlab albums
2001 compilation albums
Invisible Records compilation albums
Albums produced by Jared Louche